The Waltham Iron Ore Tramway was a  gauge industrial tramway serving the ironstone pits of the Waltham Iron Ore Company, a subsidiary of the Staveley Coal and Iron Company. It was located to the north of the village of Branston in Leicestershire on the edge of the Belvoir Estate. The tramway operated from 1884 until 1958.

History 
The Waltham Iron Ore Company was formed in 1882 to work ironstone from fields near the village of Waltham on the Wolds. It was a subsidiary of the Staveley Coal and Iron Company. The company worked these fields for less than two years, before the deposits were exhausted. They then leased further fields near the village of Branston and began extracting ore there, starting in either 1884 or 1885.

The first pits worked were Green Lane and Long Hole. These were served by a network of metre gauge tramways which were moved as the working faces progressed. They connected to the northern terminus of the Great Northern Railway's Eaton Branch Railway, which tipplers allowed unloading of the narrow gauge ore wagons into standard gauge trucks. In 1913, a new pit was opened to the east of Long Hole, called Bolton's Pit. This was reached by a longer branch of the tramway.

The original Long Hole and Green Lane quarries were exhausted by 1920. The company extended the branch to Bolton's pit to the south east to open up the new Reservoir pit, which was on the western shore of Knipton Reservoir. Reservoir pit continued in use until 1937. The Second World War saw a sharp rise in demand for iron and steel. This was followed by a steady decline in the years after the war, as cheap imported steel entered the British market. In 1949 further new sources of ironstone were needed and land was leased on the edge of the Belvoir Castle estate. A new tramway branch was laid to reach the High Leys pit. In 1951, High Leys was worked out, and the branch was extended to the new Granby pit. This was similarly abandoned in 1955 and the final extension of the branch was made to Harts pit.

Harts was the last ironstone pit worked by the Waltham Iron Ore Tramway. It closed in 1958, and with it the tramway was shut down. The line was lifted in 1959, with just a few sidings by the locomotive sheds at the southern end of the tramway left. The remaining rolling stock survived until 1960, when all but the locomotive Cambrai were cut up on site.

Locomotives

References 

Metre gauge railways in England
Industrial railways in England
Rail transport in Leicestershire